John Russell (born 1852, date of death unknown) was a United States Navy sailor and a recipient of the United States military's highest decoration, the Medal of Honor.

Biography
Born in 1852 in New York, New York, Russell joined the Navy from that state. On that day, while Trenton was at Genoa, Italy, he and Seaman Philip Moore jumped overboard and rescued Ordinary Seaman Hans Paulsen from drowning. For this action, both Russell and Moore were awarded the Medal of Honor four years later, on October 18, 1884.

Russell's official Medal of Honor citation reads:
For jumping overboard from the U.S.S. Trenton, at Genoa, Italy, 21 September 1880, and rescuing from drowning Hans Paulsen, ordinary seaman.

See also

List of Medal of Honor recipients during peacetime

References

External links

1852 births
Year of death missing
Military personnel from New York City
United States Navy sailors
United States Navy Medal of Honor recipients
Non-combat recipients of the Medal of Honor